The Minneapolis Aquatennial is an annual outdoor event held in the U.S. city of Minneapolis, Minnesota, during the third full week of July. Originating in 1940, overshadowing the teamster picnics "to take the minds of Minneapolis citizens off past troubles and focus all minds throughout the state on some pleasant event", the Minneapolis Aquatennial celebrates the city's famous lakes, rivers, and streams.

Advertised as The Best Days of Summer the festivities initially included some 200 events over 10 days (hence Aqua-ten-ial), at one point or another including the Aqua Follies, the Xcel Energy Sand Castle Competition, the Tom Thumb Milk Carton Boat Races, the Ultimate Wireless Co-ed Beach Volleyball Tournament, a sailing regatta, a tennis invitational, the Life Time Fitness Triathlon, many parades, among them the Minnegasco Torchlight Parade, the Master of International Management presents Shakespeare in the Park, Subway Block Party and the final Target Fireworks, one of the largest in the country, much larger than the city's Fourth of July celebration.

History

In 1941, among the Aqua Follies was the Aqua Dears, a synchronized swimming troupe with strict height and weight limits of 5'4" and 125 lbs

In 1971 the Tom Thumb Milk Carton Boat Races was conceived by advertising executives looking to drum up sales.

Minneapolis celebrated its centennial in 1956 in conjunction with the  Aquatennial. The city's sesquicentennial was July 18–27, 2008, the year Minnesota celebrated 150 years of statehood.

The Aquatennial was cancelled from 1942 to 1945 because of World War II, and in 2020 because of the COVID-19 pandemic.

Aquatennial Ambassador Organization Queen of the Lakes Scholarship Program
The Queen of the Lakes Scholarship Program is a week-long candidate program for women ages 18–22 that is held in Minneapolis in conjunction with the Minneapolis Aquatennial every July.

The Queen of the Lakes and two Aquatennial Princesses are chosen to represent the festival and city of Minneapolis all over the state, nation and world. Fifty young women representing communities throughout the state of Minnesota participate in the program.

Gallery

Notes

References

Further Reading
 Historyapolis, Aquatennial Fesitival, 1940

External links 

 Official Aquatennial Site
 Aquatennial Ambassadors Site

Culture of Minneapolis
Festivals in Minnesota
Tourist attractions in Minneapolis